Banga Airport  is an airstrip serving the village of Banga in Kasai Province, Democratic Republic of the Congo.

See also

 List of airports in the Democratic Republic of the Congo
 Transport in the Democratic Republic of the Congo

References

External links
 HERE Maps - Banga
 OurAirports - Banga Airport
 FallingRain - Banga Airport
 OpenStreetMap - Banga Airport
 

Airports in Kasaï Province